East Herzegovina is the eastern part of the historical Herzegovina region in Bosnia and Herzegovina, east of the Neretva river, part of the Republika Srpska entity. Major towns are Trebinje, Nevesinje and Bileća, predominantly inhabited by ethnic Serbs (see Serbs of Bosnia and Herzegovina). West Herzegovina is the western part, west of the Neretva river, and is today administratively part of the Herzegovina-Neretva Canton and West Herzegovina Canton, predominantly inhabited by ethnic Croats, located in the Federation of B&H entity. The easternmost parts of historical Herzegovina (the Duchy of St. Sava and Sanjak of Herzegovina) lie in Montenegro, in so-called "Old Herzegovina", which became part of the Principality of Montenegro in 1878. In 1991, local ethnic Serbs of the region declared the territory of SAO East Herzegovina independent and joined other Serb territories into Republika Srpska by 1992. The meso-region has since been named Trebinje Region (Regija Trebinje/Регија Требиње).

Ottoman period 
In the first Ottoman defters groups of Christian shepherds appear, declaring themselves as Vlachs who have settled in the empty parts of eastern Herzegovina. In that area, 1624 there were still 14 Catholic parish churches.

Municipalities

Culture 

The "Association of Municipalities of Herzegovina"

Events 

Miss East Herzegovina

References

Sources

Further reading
Milimir Lojović, Obren Gnjato (2016), Стара насеља источне Херцеговине и могућности њихове ревитализације, Demografija 13, pp. 353-373
Лојовић, М., 2006. Антропогеографске основе и проблеми развоја туризма источне Херцеговине. Географски факултет Универзитета у Београду.
Lojović, M. and Gnjato, O., 2016. Sustainable development of tourism in East Herzegovina. Zbornik radova-Geografski fakultet Univerziteta u Beogradu, (64), pp.361-399.
Golijanin, A.R., 2016. Essentials of the construction and exploitation of hydraulic tunnels in karst of eastern Herzegovina. Tehnika, 71(6), pp.813-819.
Samardžić, G.M., 2016. On the roman villas on the south of province of Dalmatia (Several examples from the area of East Herzegovina). Zbornik radova Filozofskog fakulteta u Prištini, (46-3), pp.3-19.
Samardžić, G.M., 2017. On numismatic findings from the southern part of the province of Dalmatia (examples from the area of Eastern Herzegovina). Zbornik radova Filozofskog fakulteta u Prištini, (47-1), pp.27-42.
Samardžić, G. (2015) Istočna Hercegovina u rimsko doba. Kosovska Mitrovica: Filozofski fakultet u Prištini 
Milanović, P.T., 2006. Karst istočne Hercegovine i Dubrovačkog priobalja: Karst of Eastern Herzegovina and Dubrovnik Littoral. Asocijacija speleoloških organizacija Srbije.
Ćorović, R., 2014. Main characteristics of demographic development of eastern Herzegovina in the second half of the 20th century and at the beginning of the 21st century. Zbornik Matice srpske za drustvene nauke, (148), pp.727-735.

Regions of Bosnia and Herzegovina
 
Regions of Republika Srpska
Serbs of Bosnia and Herzegovina